Blackthorne was an American hard rock project, that involved Bob Kulick on guitar, Graham Bonnet on vocals, Frankie Banali on drums, Jimmy Waldo on keyboards, and Chuck Wright on bass. The group released the album Afterlife through CMC International (US) and Music For Nations (Europe) in 1993. 

Kulick and Bonnet have performed as an acoustic duo on several TV shows in Europe and Japan to promote the album.

Track list and songwriting credits
 "Cradle to the Grave" (B.Kulick/J.Waldo/J.E.Bonnett/S.Rosen)
 "Afterlife" (J.E.Bonnett/J.Waldo/B.Kulick/S.Rosen)
 "We Won't Be Forgotten" (B.Kulick/Br.Kulick/P.Taylor)
 "Breaking The Chains" (B.Kulick/D.St.James/K.Benner/C.Burgi)
 "Over and Over" (B.Kulick/Br.Kulick/S.Plunkett)
 "Hard Feelings" (B.Kulick/M.Ferrari)
 "Baby You're The Blood" (B.Kulick/J.Waldo/S.Plunkett)
 "Sex Crime" (J.E.Bonnett/B.Kulick/J.Waldo/S.Plunkett)
 "Love From The Ashes" (J.E.Bonnett/J.Waldo/B.Kulick/S.Rosen)
 "All Night Long" (Roger Glover/Ritchie Blackmore)

Produced by Bob Kulick.

Reissued onto LP in 2021 by Renaissance Records

References

American hard rock musical groups